Nur Mohammad-e Yusef Rudini (also Romanized as Nūr Moḩammad-e Yūsef Rūdīnī) is a village in Dust Mohammad Rural District, in the Central District of Hirmand County, Sistan and Baluchestan Province, Iran. At the 2006 census, its population was 397, in 84 families.

References 

Populated places in Hirmand County